California Dreaming is an album by the jazz guitarist Wes Montgomery, released in 1967. It reached No. 1 on the Billboard magazine jazz album chart and No. 4 on the R&B chart. It was reissued on CD in 2007 with an alternate take of "Sunny".

Reception 

In his review for AllMusic, jazz critic Scott Yanow wrote: "The material is strictly pop fluff of the era and the great guitarist has little opportunity to do much other than state the melody in his trademark octaves. This record was perfect for AM radio of the period." The Penguin Guide to Jazz Recordings wrote that, despite starting with a recent pop hit, the album allowed some glimpses of Montgomery’s jazz playing.

Track listing 
"California Dreaming" (John Phillips, Michelle Phillips) – 3:08
"Sun Down" (Wes Montgomery) – 6:03
"Oh, You Crazy Moon" (Jimmy Van Heusen, Johnny Burke) – 3:44
"More, More, Amor" (Sol Lake) – 2:54
"Without You" (Rinaldo Marino, Walter Myers) – 3:05
"Winds of Barcelona" (Lake) – 3:07
"Sunny [alternate take]" (Bobby Hebb) – 3:07
"Sunny" (Hebb) – 4:04
"Green Peppers" (Lake) – 2:56
"Mr. Walker" (Montgomery) – 3:39
"South of the Border" (Jimmy Kennedy, Michael Carr) – 3:13

Personnel
 Wes Montgomery – guitar
 Mel Davis – trumpet
 Bernie Glow – trumpet
 Jimmy Nottingham – trumpet
 Wayne Andre – trombone
 Johnny Messner – trombone
 Bill Watrous – trombone
 James Buffington – French horn
 Don Butterfield – tuba
 Stan Webb – clarinet, English horn, saxophone
 Raymond Beckenstein – flute, piccolo, saxophone
 Herbie Hancock – piano
 Al Casamenti – guitar
 Bucky Pizzarelli – guitar
 Richard Davis – double bass
 Grady Tate – drums
 Jack Jennings –  vibraphone, castanets, scratching
 Ray Barretto – percussion

Production:
Creed Taylor – producer
Don Sebesky – arranger, conductor
Rudy Van Gelder – engineer
Gert Van Hoeyen – remastering
Dennis Drake – remastering
Ken Whitmore – cover photo, photography

Chart positions

References

1966 albums
Wes Montgomery albums
Albums produced by Creed Taylor
Verve Records albums
Albums recorded at Van Gelder Studio
Albums conducted by Don Sebesky
Albums arranged by Don Sebesky